WKBC could refer to two radio stations in North Wilkesboro, North Carolina, United States:

WKBC (AM), a radio station (800 AM)
WKBC-FM, a radio station (97.3 FM)